Continuo is a studio album by jazz bassist Avishai Cohen, released in May 2006.

Track listing

Personnel 
 Avishai Cohen – bass, electric bass, acoustic bass, handclapping, arrangement
 Sam Barsh – piano, keyboards, handclapping
 Mark Guiliana – percussion, drums, handclapping
 Amos Hoffman – oud, handclapping
 Ray Jefford – production
 Daniel Kedem – photography

References

External links
 Avishai Cohen's website

2006 albums
Avishai Cohen (bassist) albums
Sunnyside Records albums